"Catch a Falling Star" is a song written by Paul Vance and Lee Pockriss. It is best known and was made famous by Perry Como's hit version, recorded and released in late 1957.

Background and chart performance
The song's melody is based on a theme from Brahms' Academic Festival Overture. Perry Como's version features the Ray Charles Singers, who sing the refrain as a repeated round.

It was Como's last number one hit in the US, reaching number 1 on the Billboard "Most Played by Jockeys" chart but not in the overall top 100, where it reached number 3. It was the first single to receive a Recording Industry Association of America gold record certification, on March 14, 1958. In Canada, the song reached number 12 on the CHUM Charts, February 3, 1958, co-charting with Magic Moments.

Overseas, in 1958, the song also topped the Australian charts. In the UK Singles Chart, "Catch a Falling Star" peaked at number nine, whereas its B-side "Magic Moments" topped the charts.

Accolades
The single won Como the 1959 Grammy Award for Best Vocal Performance, Male.

In popular culture
The song has been featured in several films, including: 
The Princess Diaries
Love Actually
Everybody's Fine
Welcome to Me 
Never Been Kissed
It was often featured in the TV series Lost, and was most often associated with Claire Littleton and her baby, Aaron. 
It is also featured in an episode of the FX black comedy Mr Inbetween, and in Series 3 Episode 4 of William and Mary.
A musical phrase from the song appears in John Williams's score for Indiana Jones and the Kingdom of the Crystal Skull during the motorcycle chase through the college.
It was also in the musical Forever Plaid

References

Perry Como songs
1957 songs
1957 singles
1958 singles
Number-one singles in the United States
Songs written by Lee Pockriss
Songs written by Paul Vance
Grammy Award for Best Male Pop Vocal Performance
1950s ballads
RCA Victor singles